The Ministry of New and Renewable Energy (MNRE) is a ministry of the Government of India, headed by current Union Cabinet Minister Raj Kumar Singh, that is mainly responsible for research and development, intellectual property protection, and international cooperation, promotion, and coordination in renewable energy sources such as wind power, small hydro, biogas, and solar power.

The broad aim of the ministry is to develop and deploy new and renewable energy for supplementing the energy requirements of India. The current secretary of the ministry is Anand Kumar.

The ministry is headquartered in Lodhi Road, New Delhi. According to the Ministry's 2016-17 annual report, India has made significant advances in several renewable energy sectors which include, solar energy, wind power, and hydroelectricity.

History
The 1970s energy crisis led to the establishment of the Commission for Additional Sources of Energy (CASE) in the Department of Science & Technology (India) in March 1981. The CASE was responsible for the formulation of policies and their implementation, creation of programmes for development of new and renewable energy and coordinating and intensifying R&D in the sector.

In 1982, a new department was created in the then Ministry of Energy, i.e., Department of Non-conventional Energy Sources (DNES). DNES incorporated CASE under its umbrella.

The ministry was established as the Ministry of Non-Conventional Energy Sources in 1992. It adopted its current name in October 2006.

Mission
The Mission of the Ministry is to ensure
 Energy Security: Lesser dependence on oil imports through development and deployment of alternative fuels (hydrogen, bio-fuels and synthetic fuels) and their applications to contribute towards bridging the gap between domestic oil supply and demand;
 Increase in the share of clean power: Renewable (bio, wind, hydro, solar, geothermal & tidal) electricity to supplement fossil fuel based electricity generation;
 Energy Availability and Access: Supplement energy needs of cooking, heating, motive power and captive generation in rural, urban, industrial and commercial sectors;
 Energy Affordability: Cost-competitive, convenient, safe, and reliable new and renewable energy supply options; and
 Energy Equity: Per-capita energy consumption at par with the global average level by 2050, through a sustainable and diverse fuel- mix.

Vision
To develop new and renewable energy technologies, processes, materials, components, sub-systems, products & services at par with international specifications, standards and performance parameters in order to make the country a net foreign exchange earner in the sector and deploy such indigenously developed and/or manufactured products and services in furtherance of the national goal of energy security.

Key functional areas

The major functional area or Allocation of Business of MNRE are:

 Commission for Additional Sources of Energy (CASE);
 Indian Renewable Energy Development Agency (IREDA);
 Integrated Rural Energy Programme (IREP);
 Research and development of Biogas and programmes relating to Biogas units;
 Solar Energy including Solar Photovoltaic devices and their development, production, and applications;
 Programme relating to improved chulhas and research and development thereof;
 All matters relating to small/mini/micro hydel projects and below 25 MW capacities;
 Research and development of other non-conventional/renewable sources of energy and programmes relating thereto;
 Tidal energy;
 Geothermal Energy;
 Biofuel: (i) National Policy; (ii) research, development and demonstration on transport, stationary and other applications; (iii) setting up of a National Bio-fuels Development Board and strengthening the existing institutional mechanism; and (iv) overall coordination.

Initiatives
 Jawaharlal Nehru National Solar Mission (JNNSM) - The National Solar Mission was launched on 11 January 2010 by the Prime Minister. The Mission has set the ambitious target of deploying 20,000 MW of grid-connected solar power by 2022. Further, Government has revised the target of Grid Connected Solar Power Projects from 20,000 MW by the year 2021-22 to 100,000 MW by the year 2021-22 under the National Solar Mission and it was approved by Cabinet on 17 June 2015.
 National Biogas and Manure Management Programme (NBMMP)
 Solar Lantern Programme LALA
 Solar thermal energy Demonstration Programme
 Remote Village Lighting Programme
 National Biomass Cookstoves Initiative (NBCI)
 National Offshore Wind Energy Authority
Association of Renewable energy agencies of states (AREAS): It was formed by Ministry for better coordination and sharing of best practices among various state nodal agencies for renewable energy. The Minister in charge of the MNRE (Ministry of New and Renewable energy) is the patron while the Secretary of MNRE is the ex-officio president of the association.
One Sun One World One Grid initiative : The ambitious project aims to connect 140 countries of South East Asia and Middle East to a trans-national solar power grid. The idea was first proposed by India in 2018 assembly of International Solar Alliance and is aimed at moving one step ahead in the direction of target of government to produce 40% of its energy requirements from the renewable sources. The idea behind this initiative is, "Sun never sets" and it is constant at a particular geographic location at a given point of time. The Ministry of New and Renewable Energy will head this initiative with technical support from the World Bank.

Achievements

Power from renewables

Grid-based
As per Annual Report 2016-17 of Ministry, As of December 2016, the Ministry was successful in deploying a total of 50068.37 Megawatt (MW) capacity of grid-based renewable energy. 28700.44 MW of which was from Wind power, 4333.85 MW from Small hydro Power, 7907.34 MW from Bio power 9012.66 MW from Solar power (SPV), and the rest 114.08 MW from Waste to Power.

Off-grid
During the same time period, the total deployment of an Off-grid based renewable energy capacity was about 1403.70 MW. Of these, Biomass (non-bagasse) Cogeneration consisted of 651.91 MW, Bio mass Gasifier was 186.88 MW Waste to energy was 163.35 MW, SPV Systems (of less than 1 Kilowatt (kW)) capacity was 405.54 1 MW, and the rest from micro-Hydro and Wind power.

Other renewable energy systems
The total number of deployment of Family Biogas plant was 49.40 lakhs. And the total area that is covered with Solar water heating (SWH) systems was 4.47 Million m2.

Institutions
The Ministry has 5 specialized technical institution. They are:-

 National Institute of Solar Energy (NISE): National Institute of Solar Energy, an autonomous institution of Ministry of New and Renewable (MNRE), is the apex National R&D institution in the field Solar Energy. The Government of India has converted 25-year-old Solar Energy Centre (SEC) under MNRE to an autonomous institution in September 2013 to assist the Ministry in implementing the National Solar Mission and to coordinate research, technology, skill development, training, consultancy, incubation and other related works.  NISE is located in Gurugram, Haryana
 National Institute of Wind Energy (NIWE):  NIWE has been established in Chennai in the year 1998, as an autonomous R&D institution by the Ministry of New and Renewable Energy (MNRE), Government of India. It is a knowledge-based institution of high quality and dedication, offers services and seeks to find complete solutions for the kinds of difficulties and improvements in the entire spectrum of the wind energy sector by carrying out further research. NIWE is located in Chennai, Tamil Nadu. Website : https://niwe.res.in/
 Sardar Swaran Singh National Institute of Bio-Energy (SSS-NIBE): SSS-NIBE is an autonomous Institution of the Ministry of New and Renewable Energy.  Govt. of India spread over a sprawling campus of about 75 acres, the Institute is marching towards development into a Global Centre of Excellence in the Bio-Energy.  The objectives of the Institute are to carry out and facilitate research, design, development, testing, standardization & technology demonstration eventually leading to commercialization of RD&D output with a focus on bioenergy, biofuels & synthetic fuels in solid, liquid & gaseous forms for transportation, portable & stationary applications, development of hybrid / integrated energy systems, to undertake & facilitate human resource development at all levels including postdoctoral research. It is located in Kapurthala (Punjab).
 Indian Renewable Energy Development Agency (IREDA): IREDA is a Non-Banking Financial Institution under the administrative control of this Ministry for providing term loans for renewable energy and energy efficiency projects.IREDA  is a Public Limited Government Company.
 Solar Energy Corporation of India (SECI):  SECI is a CPSU under the administrative control of the Ministry of New and Renewable Energy (MNRE), set up on 20th Sept 2011 to facilitate the implementation of JNNSM and achievement of targets set therein. It is the only CPSU dedicated to the solar energy sector. It was originally incorporated as a section-25 (not for profit) company under the Companies Act, 1956

State Nodal Agencies
The Ministry has established state nodal agencies in different states and union territories of India to promote and expand the growth of efficient energy use of renewable energy in their respective states. The primary objective of a state nodal agency under this ministry is to develop, coordinate, finance and promote research projects in the new and renewable energy field. It is also expected to devise programmes for research and development as well as applicative extensions of new and renewable energy sources.

List of Ministers

List of Ministers of State

See also
 Energy policy of India
 National hydrogen energy road map
 Renewable energy in India
 Wind power in India

References

External links
Official website MNRE
Official website Ministry of Power
Solar Energy Corporation of India
National Institute of Solar Energy
National Institute of Wind Energy, India
Indian Renewable Energy Development Agency

 
New and Renewable Energy
Government agencies for energy (India)
India